Robert Paterson may refer to:
 Robert Paterson (principal) (d.1717), Principal of Marischal College in Aberdeen
 Robert Paterson (stonemason) (1715–1801), Scottish stonemason
 Robert Paterson (bishop) (born 1949), Anglican Bishop of Sodor and Man, Isle of Man
 Robert Paterson (composer) (born 1970), American composer
 Robert Paterson (cricketer) (1916–1980), English cricketer
 Robert Paterson (soccer) (born 1967), former U.S. soccer forward
 Robert Paterson (impresario) (1940–1991), English concert promoter and impresario
 Robert Paterson (Scottish architect) (1825–1889), Scottish architect
 Robert Adams Paterson (1829–1904), Scottish golf ball inventor
 Robert Hamilton Paterson (1843–1911), Scottish architect
 Bob Paterson (1875–1960), Australian rules footballer for Geelong
 Bobby Paterson (born 1927), Scottish footballer
 Bobby Paterson (bass guitarist) (1956–2006), Scottish bass guitarist

See also
 Robert Patterson (disambiguation)
 Robert Pattinson (born 1986), English actor